Iglesia de Santa Eulalia (Abamia) is a church in Asturias, Spain, in the vicinity of Covadonga.

Pelagius of Asturias, who in 718 conquered a Moorish army in Covadonga to begin the so-called Spanish Reconquista, and his wife were originally buried here.

References

Churches in Asturias
Pelagius of Asturias
Bien de Interés Cultural landmarks in Asturias